Uncle Deadly may refer to:

Uncle Deadly (Muppet), a character from the Muppets
Uncle Deadly (band), a Norwegian band